Daffey is a surname. Notable people with the surname include:

Mark Daffey (1908–1967), Australian rules footballer
Paul Daffey, Australian sports journalist

See also
Gaffey
Laffey

Surnames of Welsh origin